"Skin Deep" is a rock song originally written in 1986 for Japanese singer-songwriter CINDY by Mark Goldenberg and Jon Lind, then covered by American singer-actress Cher for her eighteenth studio album, Cher. It was released as the album's third and final single in mid-1988.

Background
Allmusic's Jose F. Promis later described it as "a club hit with the almost forgotten Madonna-ish dance ditty "Skin Deep" (a radical departure from the album's other songs, yet a definite highlight)."

Track listing
US and European 7" and cassette single
"Skin Deep" (Edit/Remix) – 3:54
"Perfection" – 4:28

US 12" single
"Skin Deep" (Extended Dance Mix) – 7:48
"Skin Deep" (Dub) – 5:40
"Skin Deep" (Bonus Beats) – 3:40
"Perfection" – 4:28

European 12" and CD single
"Skin Deep" (Extended Dance Mix) – 7:48
"Skin Deep" (Dub) – 5:40
"Perfection" – 4:28

Charts

References

External links
Official website of Cher

1988 singles
Cher songs
Songs written by Jon Lind
Songs written by Mark Goldenberg
1987 songs
Geffen Records singles